Patrick County Courthouse is a historic courthouse building located at Stuart, Patrick County, Virginia. It was built in 1822, and is a two-story, brick building consisting of a projecting, three-bay central block with flanking wings in the Jeffersonian Roman Revival style. The front facade features a pedimented portico supported by four Tuscan order columns.  It is topped by a small bell tower.  The building was remodeled in 1928, and refurbished in 1936 and 1971.

It was listed on the National Register of Historic Places in 1974. It is a contributing property in the Stuart Uptown Historic District.

References

Courthouses on the National Register of Historic Places in Virginia
County courthouses in Virginia
Government buildings completed in 1822
Buildings and structures in Patrick County, Virginia
National Register of Historic Places in Patrick County, Virginia
Individually listed contributing properties to historic districts on the National Register in Virginia
1822 establishments in Virginia